Zvonko Šundovski is a former Macedonian team handball player and a former coach of the North Macedonia National Handball Team. He was born on 7 September 1967 in Bitola. Starting from October 2010, he served as the head coach of the Macedonia national team, and since the summer of 2012 he was also in charge of Romanian top division side HCM Constanța. From June 2015, he served as coach of Romanian club CSM București.

His first station as a coach was in 2003 with the club team RK Pelister, which he led to the double win of the national championship and cup. Already in 2006, Šundovski was coaching not only the men’s junior national team but also the men’s senior national team, whom he led in 2009 through their World Championship journey in Croatia. In the season 2008/09 Šundovski managed RK Metalurg Skopje and led the club as Macedonian champions into the EHF Champions League as well as round four of the EHF Cup Winners' Cup.

As team coach of Macedonia, Šundovski achieved 5th place in the 2012 European Men's Handball Championship in Serbia.

As of January 23, 2013, Šundovski is no longer a coach of the Macedonia National Handball Team. He resigned with a statement to the press, and an official email to the Macedonian Handball Federation in which he explained his leaving from the function. He took full responsibility for the low performance of the Macedonia National Handball Team at the 2013 World Men's Handball Championship in Spain.

Clubs

Head coach
2003–2007: RK Pelister: Macedonian League
2007–2009: RK Metalurg Skopje: Macedonian League
2012–2015: H.C.M. Constanța: Romanian League
2015–2017: CSM București: Romanian League
2018–2019: HC Dobrogea Sud: Romanian League
2020–2021: Al-Rayyan: Qatar Handball League

Head coaching career with national teams
2006–2008: Macedonia junior national handball team
2008–2010: Macedonia(assistant)
2010–2013: Macedonia
2017–2018: Israel

Championships and cups as head coach

National domestic league championships won

 Macedonian Super League season 2004/2005 – RK Pelister
 Romanian Liga Nationala season 2011/2012 – HCM Constanta
 Romanian Liga Nationala season 2012/2013 – HCM Constanta
 Romanian Liga Nationala season 2013/2014 – HCM Constanta

National domestic cup championships won

 Macedonian Cup season 2004/2005 – RK Pelister
 Macedonian Cup season 2008/2009 – RK Metalurg Skopje
 Romanian Cup season 2011/2012 HCM Constanta
 Romanian Cup season 2012/2013 HCM Constanta
 Romanian Cup season 2013/2014 HCM Constanta
 Romanian Cup season 2015/2016 CSM Bucuresti

National domestic super cup championships won

 Romanian Super Cup season 2012/2013 HCM Constanta 
 Romanian Super Cup season 2013/2014 HCM Constanta

Individual Honours

 Best handball coach of North Macedonia for the year 2005-2006
 Best young coach of the year of North Macedonia (in all sports) 2007- 2008
 Most successful handball coach in North Macedonia, for the year 2009
 Most successful sports worker in Municipality of Bitola for the year 2011
 The most successful  head coach of the National selections  in North Macedonia for the year 2011
 Special Merit Medal from the President of the Republic of North Macedonia for achieved results on International level. Year 2012
 Best Handball Coach of Romania, for the season 2013/2014, as HCM Constanta makes history with the placement in the Final Four of EHF Cup in Berlin, and HCM Constanta wins the National Championship, National Cup and Super Cup of Romania. First time in the History of Romanian Handball this merit goes to International Coach.

References

External links
Macedonian Handball Federation

Living people
1967 births
Macedonian male handball players
Macedonian handball coaches
Macedonian expatriate sportspeople in Romania